During the 1996–97 season, SC Bastia finished in 7th place in Ligue 1, the top tier of French football. Their top scorer of the season, including 19 goals in 18 league matches, was Anto Drobnjak. They were eliminated from the Coupe de France in the round of 32 and the Coupe de la Ligue in the first round.

Transfers

In 
Summer
 Patrick Moreau, Lubomir Moravcik and Sébastien Perez from St. Etienne
 Wilfried Gohel from Strasbourg
 Ermin Siljak from Olimpija
 Laurent Weber from Valenciennes
 Pascal Camadini from Perpignan
 Jamie Fullarton from St Mirren
 Fabien Piveteau from AS Monaco
 Patrick Valery from Toulouse

Winter
 No.

Out 
Summer
 Bruno Rodriguez to Strasbourg
 Bruno Valencony to Nice
 Andre Biancarelli to Metz
 Jean-Christophe Debu to free
 Remy Loret to Toulouse
 Dume Franchi to unknown
 William to Compostela
 Bruno Alicarte to Alaves
 Frédéric Darras to Swindon Town

Winter
 Pierre Laurent to Leeds United

Squad

French Division 1

League table

Results summary

Results by round

Matches

Coupe de France

Coupe de la Ligue

Top scorers

Notes

References 

SC Bastia seasons
Bastia